Irfan Haarys Bachdim (born 11 August 1988) is an Indonesian professional footballer who plays as a winger or attacking midfielder for Liga 1 club Persis Solo.

Early life 
Irfan father, Noval, is an Indonesian national of Arab descent born in Malang, East Java. He lived in the resort area of Lawang outside Malang before moving to the Netherlands in the 1980s, where he resettled and married Hester van Dijk, a Dutch national. Irfan was born in Amsterdam as the couple's second son and lived there until adulthood. As he has maintained his Indonesian nationality throughout his life, he is not considered naturalised.

Irfan was born to a family of footballers. Noval formerly played for PS Fajar Lawang (an association member of Persekam Malang) in the 1980s. Additionally, Irfan's grandfather, Ali, played for Persema Malang in his hometown and PSAD Jakarta, a military team, as he also served in the Indonesian Navy.

Club career

Early career 
Irfan Bachdim started his football career at SV Argon in 1997 and moved in 1998 to the famed Ajax Youth Academy in Amsterdam, where he trained along with Mitchell Donald, Jeffrey Sarpong, Christian Supusepa and Ryan Babel. After three years there, he returned to SV Argon, where he became the youth league's top scorer despite his midfield position.

FC Utrecht 
Scouts of FC Utrecht, a club that has never been absent from the top flight of Dutch football, recruited him in 2003. He started for FC Utrecht's junior team, all the while appearing on occasions for the senior reserve team. He made his debut for FC Utrecht in the Dutch top-tier league, the Eredivisie, on February 17, 2008, playing 90 minutes against VVV-Venlo.

Bachdim joined the Indonesia national under-23 football team during a training camp that took place in the Netherlands. However, his debut in Indonesia's red and white colors had to be delayed because he was injured one week prior to the 2006 Asian Games.

HFC Haarlem 
After FC Utrecht chose not to extend his contract, Bachdim signed for HFC Haarlem in July 2009 in a free transfer deal. In March 2010, he underwent trials in Indonesia for Persib Bandung and Persija Jakarta. However, neither club signed him.

Persema Malang 
Bachdim's desire to play in Indonesia was finally realized on August 9, 2010, upon his recruitment by the then-coach of Persema Malang, Timo Scheunemann, after the latter observed the former and other young footballers in a charity match for football figure Lucky Acub Zaenal at the Gajayana Stadium in Malang, the birthplace of Bachdim's father. Bachdim was recruited along with Kim Jeffrey Kurniawan, a footballer of Indonesian-German descent who previously played for FC Heidelsheim in Germany. Bachdim, who had been a holder of Indonesian passport since his childhood, was recognized and recruited as an Indonesian-born, not a naturalized player. At Persema, Bachdim played more at the front as second striker or winger.

After Persema's decision to move from the Indonesian Super League (ISL) to the Indonesian Premier League (IPL) during the 2011 schism in Indonesian football management, Bachdim considered leaving Persema due to the threat of not being able to play for the national team. The football federation, PSSI, considered the new competition as a renegade league. However, he ended up committing himself to Persema by signing a three-year contract, despite continuous intimidation from PSSI to leave the club and valuable contracts offered by several ISL clubs. Eventually, Youth and Sports Minister Andi Mallarangeng guaranteed Bachdim's right to perform for the national team. He was called by the U-23 team to play at the 2011 Southeast Asian Games and the qualifications for the 2012 Olympics.

Chonburi FC 
As the league dualism in Indonesia continued to undermine the smooth running of competitions, Bachdim participated in trials outside Indonesia. He tried his luck at leading Thailand club BEC Tero Sasana, where he was able to give an average performance but failed to be selected. His efforts succeeded in 2013 when he was signed by another Thailand club Chonburi on a two-year contract.

In early December 2013 after failing to get a regular spot, Bachdim went for trials at J-League clubs Vegalta Sendai and Ventforet Kofu. He said that if he did not get a contract with any of these clubs, he would go back to Chonburi to prove himself to the new manager. Ventforet Kofu recruited him after a few weeks.

Ventforet Kofu 
Bachdim announced on Monday, 27 January 2014 that he had officially joined J. League first-division side Ventforet Kofu. According to Ventforet, the club thought highly of the forward's potential during a tryout held by the J. League Players Association. His fast playing style as a winger caught the club's eye even though he was not in top physical condition at the time.

Ventforet general manager Satoru Sakuma said Bachdim will be the J. League's first Indonesian player and his contract will run through the end of the 2014 season. However, he failed to win playing time.

Hokkaido Consadole Sapporo 
Japanese media on Monday, December 22, 2014 published that J2 league team Hokkaido Consadole Sapporo had signed Bachdim from Ventforet Kofu despite the Indonesian international's lack of playtime. Bachdim was one of six new players whom the club presented on January 20, 2015. On May 3, 2015, Bachdim made his first J2 appearance in Consadole Sapporo's 3–0 win over Jubilo Iwata. After replacing Brazilian teammate Nildo on the right flank, Bachdim drew cheers from the crowd when he streaked up the sideline and sent a well-placed cross in his first play.

Bali United 
After injuries upset his football experience in Japan, Bachdim in 2017 returned to Indonesia to play for the up-and-coming Bali United F.C., which has developed a strong fanbase since the club began to play in Bali island's Gianyar Regency in 2015. It was in Bali where Bachdim found his professional and personal comfort zone. He was the favorite of the fans who often see him ride a scooter to the training pitch from his private residence. He played 66 times for the club and impressed with his goals and trademark sideline dribbles under loud chants from the fans who had their own song for the player who they called the prince. Bachdim helped give the tourist island of Bali its first national football title when Bali United won the 2019 Liga 1 competition.

Unfortunately, his injuries often recurred in Bali, forcing him to slide down the pecking order and give way for fitter players throughout the years. In early 2020, Bali United made it clear that his service would not be retained. His fans gave a heartfelt send-off after his last session as a Bali United player. On 14 February 2020, Bachdim was officially introduced at less glamorous Liga 1 club PSS Sleman, which is also known for its ultras who have propelled a revolution in the club. Sleman fans, however, were unimpressed when Bachdim expressed his love for Bali and Bali United during the transition.

PSS Sleman 
Before Bachdim could endear himself to the supporters of his new club, the 2020 Liga 1 competition stopped only after three games due to the COVID-19 pandemic that led to restrictions against professional football matches for one full year. He renewed his contract in 2021 after PSS signed his brother-in-law and former Persema teammate Kim Kurniawan, pledging he would fulfil his mission to boost PSS move forward.

Persis Solo
In 2021, Bachdim joined Liga 2 club Persis Solo After resigning from Liga 1 club PSS Sleman. He made his league debut on 15 November 2021 in a match against PSIM Yogyakarta at the Manahan Stadium, Surakarta. On 30 December 2021, Bachdim scored his first goal for Persis against RANS Cilegon in the 40th minute at the Pakansari Stadium, Cibinong.

International career 

Irfan Bachdim on 1 December 2010 debuted for the Indonesian national team at the 2010 AFF Championship and helped the squad reach the final match. His two goals in the competition propelled him into football stardom in Indonesia. From this point, he became a regular choice for the national team until late 2019 under different coaches. He was called up for the February 2020 national team training under new coach Shin Tae-yong.

Career statistics

International

International goals 
Scores and results list Indonesia's goal tally first.

Honours

Club 
Consadole Sapporo
 J2 League: 2016
Bali United
 Liga 1: 2019
Indonesia President's Cup runner-up: 2018
PSS Sleman
 Menpora Cup third place: 2021
Persis Solo
 Liga 2: 2021

International 
Indonesia
 AFF Championship runner-up: 2010

Individual
Indonesia Kids' Choice Awards favorite athlete: 2011
Liga 1 Best XI: 2017

Personal life 
Bachdim is a celebrity in Indonesia. He is well known for starring in many product advertisements including Pocari Sweat, Suzuki, Nike, and many more. He is one of the very select few Indonesian footballers who have appeared in other scopes outside of football. He is massively popular domestically among female fans due to his looks and personality.

Bachdim is married to Jennifer Kurniawan, a model born to a Chinese Indonesian father and a German mother. She is also the older sister of footballer Kim Kurniawan, who joined Bachdim at PSS on 28 February 2021. The couple met when the two Europe-trained footballers explored opportunities to play in Indonesia in 2010. On 8 July 2011, Bachdim and Kurniawan tied the knot in Germany. On 5 February 2012, Bachdim's first child and daughter, Kiyomi Sue Bachdim, was born. Two years later, on 21 March 2014, Bachdim's second child and first son, Kenji Zizou Bachdim, was born. Their third, Kiyoji Bachdim, was born on 1 March 2021, a few days before Bachdim renewed his contract with PSS. The Bachdims reside in Bali, where they also run a clothing line.

References

External links 
 
 
 

 Irfan Bachdim Interview

1988 births
Living people
Footballers from Amsterdam
Indonesian footballers
FC Utrecht players
HFC Haarlem players
Eredivisie players
Eerste Divisie players
Persema Malang players
Indonesian Premier League players
Indonesian people of Yemeni descent
Indonesian people of Dutch descent
Indo people
Dutch people of Indonesian descent
Dutch people of Yemeni descent
Dutch people of Javanese descent
Indonesian expatriate sportspeople in Thailand
Indonesian expatriate sportspeople in Japan
Indonesian expatriate footballers
Indonesia international footballers
Expatriate footballers in Thailand
Expatriate footballers in Japan
Irfan Bachdim
Irfan Bachdim
Irfan Bachdim
J2 League players
Ventforet Kofu players
Hokkaido Consadole Sapporo players
Liga 1 (Indonesia) players
Liga 2 (Indonesia) players
Bali United F.C. players
PSS Sleman players
Persis Solo players
Association football forwards
Association football wingers
SV Argon players